This article lists universities in Liechtenstein.

Universities 

At the moment there are four general higher education institutions in Liechtenstein:
 International Academy for Philosophy (German: Internationale Akademie für Philosophie)
 Liechtenstein Institute
 Private University in the Principality of Liechtenstein
 University of Liechtenstein

Education in Liechtenstein
Liechtenstein
Liechtenstein

Universities
Universities